Ray Bomba (February 14, 1907 – June 24, 1986) was an American sound editor who was nominated during the 18th Academy Awards for the film A Thousand and One Nights in the category of Best Special Effects. His nomination was shared with Lawrence W. Butler.

Filmography

The Man Who Understood Women (1959)
The Roots of Heaven (1958)
Sing, Boy, Sing (1958)
The Three Faces of Eve (1957)
Will Success Spoil Rock Hunter? (1957)
Bigger Than Life (1956)
On the Threshold of Space (1956)
The Girl in the Red Velvet Swing (1955)
How to Be Very, Very Popular (1955)
Love Is a Many-Splendored Thing (1955)
The Rains of Ranchipur (1955)
Soldier of Fortune (1955)
Broken Lance (1954)
Désirée (1954)
There's No Business Like Show Business (1954)
A Thousand and One Nights (1945)

References

External links

American sound editors
People from Beeville, Texas
1907 births
1986 deaths
People from Encino, Los Angeles